This is a list of ambassadors of the United States to Kazakhstan.

Kazakhstan had been a constituent Soviet Socialist Republic (SSR) of the Soviet Union. Upon dissolution of the Soviet Union, Kazakhstan declared independence on December 16, 1991. It was the last of the Soviet republics to declare independence.

The United States recognized Kazakhstan ten days later on December 26, 1991. The U.S. embassy was established in Almaty (then named Alma-Ata) on February 3, 1992, with William Harrison Courtney as chargé d'affaires ad interim. He was subsequently appointed as the first U.S. ambassador to Kazakhstan.

In 1997 the nation's capital was moved to Astana, where the U.S. embassy is now located.

Ambassadors

See also
Kazakhstan – United States relations
Foreign relations of Kazakhstan
Ambassadors of the United States
List of ambassadors of Kazakhstan to the United States

References

United States Department of State: Background notes on Kazakhstan

External links
United States Department of State: Chiefs of Mission for Kazakhstan
United States Department of State: Kazakhstan
United States Embassy in Astana

Kazakhstan

United States